Hulikeri is a village in Dharwad district of Karnataka, India.

Demographics 
As of the 2011 Census of India there were 323 households in Hulikeri and a total population of 1,505 consisting of 792 males and 713 females. There were 183 children ages 0-6.

References

Villages in Dharwad district